Local elections were held in Pasay on May 14, 2007 within the Philippine general election. The voters elected for the elective local posts in the city: the mayor, vice mayor, the representative for the lone district, and the councilors, six of them in the two districts of the city.

Background
Mayor Wenceslao Trinidad ran for his fourth nonconsecutive term. His partner was Vice Mayor Antonino Calixto.

Representative Ma. Consuelo Dy also ran for the mayoralty post. Her partner was former Acting Vice Mayor and Second District Councilor Arvin "Bong" Tolentino.

Former Acting Mayor and Second District Councilor Allan Panaligan ran for a congressional seat. His main opponents were Second District Councilor Jose Antonio Roxas, Ricardo "Ding" Santos, former chief security aide of former Mayor Pablo Cuneta, and former Rep. Lorna Verano-Yap.

Candidates

Administration Team

Team Trinidad Calixto Roxas

Opposition Team

Team Connie Dy

Others

Team Kaibigan

Aksyon Demokratiko

Independent

Results
Names written in bold-italic are the re-elected incumbents while in italic are incumbents lost in elections.

For Representative
Second District Councilor Jose Antonio "Lito" Roxas defeated former Acting Mayor Allan Panaligan, retired police Ricardo "Ding" Santos, and former Rep. Lorna Verano-Yap.

For Mayor
Mayor Wenceslao Trinidad defeated Representative Ma. Consuelo Dy.

For Vice Mayor
Vice Mayor Antonino Calixto defeated Second District Councilor Arvin "Bong" Tolentino and former Vice Mayor Gregorio "Greg" Alcera.

For Councilors

First District
Four of the six incumbents were re-elected. Former Councilor Ma. Luisa "Bing" Petallo made a successful city council comeback. Former Acting Councilor Mary Grace Santos sealed her seat as newly duly elected councilor of the district.

Former Councilors Eduardo "Ed" Advincula (father of re-electionist Richard Advincula), Reynaldo "Rey" Mateo, and  Panfilo "Justo" Justo failed to secure a city council seat.

|-bgcolor=black
|colspan=5|

Second District
Three of the six incumbents were re-elected. Former Councilors Imelda "Emi" Calixto-Rubiano and Reynaldo Padua made a successful comeback in the city council. Calixto-Rubiano lost in congressional race in 2004 to then re-electionist Ma. Consuelo Dy. Ian Vendivel, who placed 6th, was the newly-elected councilor in the district.

|-bgcolor=black
|colspan=5|

References

Elections in Pasay
2007 Philippine local elections
2007 elections in Metro Manila